The Karabiner Modell 1931 (K. 31/Kar. 31/Mq. 31) is a magazine-fed, straight-pull bolt-action rifle. It was the standard issue rifle of the Swiss armed forces from 1933 until 1958 though examples remained in service into the 1970s. It has a 6-round removable magazine, and is chambered for the 7.5×55mm Swiss Gewehrpatrone 1911 or GP 11, a cartridge with ballistic qualities similar to the 7.62×51mm NATO/.308 Winchester cartridge. Each rifle included a 6-round detachable box magazine with matching stamped serial number. A stripper clip can be used to load the magazine from the top of the receiver.

The Karabiner Modell 1931 replaced both the Model 1911 rifle and carbine and was gradually replaced by the Stgw 57 from 1958 onwards.

Although the K. 31/Kar. 31 is a straight-pull carbine broadly based on previous Swiss "Schmidt–Rubin" service rifles and carbines, the K. 31/Kar. 31 was not designed by Colonel Rudolf Schmidt (1832–1898) as he was not alive in 1931 to do so.
Mechanical engineer Eduard Rubin (1846–1920) was the designer of the 7.5×55mm Swiss ammunition previous Swiss service rifles and the K. 31/Kar. 31 are chambered for.
The Karabiner Modell 31 was a new design by the Eidgenössische Waffenfabrik in Bern, Switzerland under Colonel Adolf Furrer (1873–1958). The first 200 K. 31/Kar. 31s were made in May 1931 for troop trials (serials 500,001 – 500,200), thus the model number of 1931.

Design details

Features
Compared to the previous Schmidt–Rubin series Model 1911 rifle and carbine, the Karabiner Modell 31 bolt and receiver were significantly shortened, allowing for a rifle length barrel and sight radius, without increasing the overall length of the Model 1911 carbine, moving the rear sight element closer to the eye, and cutting in half the amount of time for the firing pin to strike the cartridge after the trigger was pulled.

The Karabiner Modell 31 barrel has 4 rifling grooves and a  rifling twist rate. The action itself is only connected to the stock by two screws, one attaching to the recoil lug, with the second attaching to the tang. This allowed the Swiss to eliminate the aluminium barrel mounting collar used in the Schmidt-Rubin series. The trigger was also redesigned.

Karabiner Modell 31s are noted for their excellent accuracy and quality for a service rifle. The Swiss armed forces considered individual marksmanship to be of utmost importance. Therefore, the K. 31/Kar. 31 was made to tight tolerances and excellent overall craftsmanship.
R50 at a range means the closest 50% of the shot group will all be within a circle of the mentioned diameter at that distance. The employed circular error probable method cannot be converted and is not comparable to US military methods for determining rifle accuracy. When the R50 results are doubled the hit probability increases to 93.7%.

K. 31/Kar. 31 straight-pull action system
The Karabiner Modell 31 is noted for its straight-pull bolt action, meaning that the bolt handle is pulled directly rearward to unlock the action and eject the spent cartridge case in one motion, and then pushing the bolt handle forward again to chamber a new cartridge, cock the striker, and lock the action, rather than being manually turned and pulled back and forth, as in contemporary bolt action service rifles, like the German Karabiner 98k, or the British Lee–Enfield Rifle No. 4. A straight-pull bolt action reduces the range of motion by the shooter, with the goal of increasing the rifle's rate of fire.

Unlike the previous Schmidt–Rubin series of rifles, the K. 31/Kar. 31's locking lugs lock up immediately behind the chamber. This forward positioning of the locking lugs affords several advantages. The entire action is strengthened as the lugs lock into the much thicker forward part of the receiver. Lock-up is also more precise.

Safety
The cocking piece doubles as a safety and is attached at the rear of the bolt sleeve assembly and secures the firing pin. When the cocking piece ending in a cocking ring is pulled rearward and turned horizontal, the cocking piece sear can be placed in a recessed safety slot in the bolt plug. This slot is shorter than the firing slot so the firing pin cannot protrude past the face of the bolt cylinder. Any contact with the cartridge primer is thus prevented. The safe mode also prevents the action from being cycled hence preventing the bolt from accidental opening. The operating ring is quite large, making it easy to operate with gloves. When the operating ring is in the vertical position and pulled back by cycling the action or cocking it by hand the action is ready to fire.

Ammunition feeding

The Karabiner Modell 31 feeds from a detachable box magazine machined to match the cartridge for which the rifle was being chambered, that can hold up to 6 rifle cartridges. The magazine release button is an integral part of the magazine.
For reloading the K. 31/Kar. 31 box magazine was normally not exchanged for another magazine but a unique formed phenolic resin embedded paper stripper clip with a tinned metal edge holding six rounds was used. Whereas most chargers or stripper clips only held the rounds at the end of the cartridge cases, the K. 31/Kar. 31 charger nearly covers the entire cartridge. The charger has a guide slot wide enough for a gloved thumb to force rounds down and into the magazine in one smooth motion. The chargers or stripper clips have to be manually removed before the bolt can be closed.
When the last cartridge from the magazine is fired, the follower comes up automatically during cycling locking the bolt open and preventing it from closing reminding the user the K. 31/Kar. 31 needs to be reloaded.

Trigger
The Karabiner Modell 31 has a two-stage trigger with a noticeable long take up before the trigger engages the sear. This feature aids in preventing premature firing during stressful (combat) situations.

Sights
 

The sight line can be adjusted with a front sight adjustment tool. To adjust the average height of the point of impact 5 front posts ranging from  height in  increments are available.

A 6 o'clock hold is only good for a known target size at a known distance and will not hold zero without user adjustment if these factors are varied.

As the Swiss have a militia army where soldiers sometimes keep their service rifles for a lifetime and also compete with their service rifle. Many aftermarket sights were available: Waffenfabrik Bern made the "S" and "K" (Klammer) diopter sights, Wyss makes the "W" diopter and Furter, Haemmerli and Gruenig & Elmiger made special windage and elevation fine-correctors, Sahli and many other made elevation fine correctors and these days a company by the name of Swiss Products in the United States makes a clamp-on diopter which was recently approved for use at official Swiss shooting matches.

Modifications history
During its production run there were several modifications tested, rejected and made to the K. 31/Kar. 31.

Accessories

Karabiner Modell 31s were issued with slings, muzzle caps, knife-type detachable bayonets, cleaning kits and carrying pouches for stripper clips.

Variants

There were three Karabiner Modell 31 variants that featured telescopic sights. These were the:
 Zf.
 Zf.
The telescopic sights of these models were made by Kern and mounted on production Karabiner Modell 31s chosen for their accuracy offset on the left side of the receiver enabling the shooter to use the standard iron sight line.

In the 1950s an elaborate modified variant of the Karabiner Modell 31 was developed for designated marksman/sniper use. This rifle was not issued as a Model 31 variant, but as the Zielfernrohr-Karabiner 55 (Zf. Kar. 55) Sniper Rifle. The bullet drop compensation (BDC) adjustment turret is free spinning under grease friction. Like the standard K. 31/Kar. 31 iron sight line elevation concept the BDC adjustment of the telescopic sight is somewhat unconventional and designed for center hold (point of aim = point of impact) at the  settings with GP11 ammunition. At more distant ranges the shooter should aim below the bottom of the target for a 6 o'clock hold, so that the reticle's post is just out of the way. The windage adjustment turret of the telescopic sight features more conventional click adjustments. The full increments are themselves subdivided into six  at  (0.25 mil/0.25 ‰) clicks.
The Zf.
The Zf. Kar. 55 only has four small parts in common (the cocking piece, the firing pin, the firing pin spring, and the extractor) with the Karabiner Modell 31. The telescopic sight mounts are an integral part of the receiver. The 3.5×23 telescopic sight features an integral quick release mount that connects to the mounts on the left side of the receiver. The entire action of the Zf. Kar. 55 is tilted at an angle of approximately 15 degrees to provide room for the unimpaired loading and ejecting cartridges with the telescopic sight mounted. The tilting of the action and magazine also provided a centered position of the telescopic sight over the action and stock at the cost of widening the rifle somewhat. The barrel fitted to the Zf. Kar. 55 is heavier than the one on the Karabiner Modell 31 and is fitted with a muzzle brake. The Zf. Kar. 55 also has a half-stock with a checkered pistol grip instead of a semi-pistol grip and an underfolding integrated bipod. A total of 4,150 Zf. Kar. 55s where manufactured.

Poor stock condition
The poor condition of many stocks was caused mostly by the wearing of crampons [ice-cleats that project not only from the sole but the sides of the heels] worn over hobnail boots and rifle drills that were common. The military habit of stacking rifles in threes - often in the snow - also contributes to the 'ragged' appearance of the end of the butt. Postwar beech stocks are more affected than the older walnut ones. Walnut stocks - the material of choice prior to 1946 - were treated with linseed oil and later beech stocks got a shellac protective layer that easily dissolves in alcohol for (arsenal) repairs.

Availability
As of 2010, the Swiss arsenals are long sold out and the rifles now available for sale from military surplus vendors in countries around the world are ex-Swiss-civilian owned rifles. The stocks are usually in average condition, but the barrel and bolt assembly are usually in very good condition because the Swiss used a special gun grease known as Waffenfett instead of gun cleaning oil, and the issued ammunition was non-corrosive. Some K. 31/Kar. 31s can be found with "trooper tags" underneath the steel butt plate at the rear end of the stock, showing its former Swiss government user. Many collectors of the K. 31/Kar. 31 recovered a small tag of plasticized paper containing the military unit, name and address and pension number of the Swiss citizen to whom the rifle was issued. In some cases, collectors have used the information to contact the previous users, and have recounted the details of those encounters on a variety of collector's web forums.

Accuracy potential
Karabiner Modell 31s are noted for their excellent accuracy and quality for a service rifle. The Swiss armed forces considered individual marksmanship to be of utmost importance. Therefore, the K. 31/Kar. 31 was made to tight tolerances and excellent overall craftsmanship.
The Swiss Military manual for the Karabiner Modell 31 using standard issue 7.5×55mm Swiss GP 11 ball ammunition in a fixed mounting mentions the expected accuracy of fire at various ranges.

The following table lists accuracy statistics for typical in service K31 rifles firing 7.5×55mm Swiss GP 11 service ammunition. The statistics were computed under the 1930s era Swiss method for determining accuracy, which is more complex than Western methods which usually involve firing a group of shots and then measuring the overall diameter of the group. The Swiss method differs in that after a group of shots is fired into the target from a machine rest hits on the outer part of the target are disregarded, while only half of the hits on the inner part of the circles are counted (50% or R50), which significantly reduces the overall diameter of the groups.  The vertical and horizontal measurements of the reduced groups are then used to measure accuracy. This circular error probable method used by the Swiss and other European militaries cannot be converted and is not comparable to US military methods for determining rifle accuracy. When the R50 results are doubled the hit probability increases to 93.7%.

 R50 means the closest 50 percent of the shot group will all be within a circle of the mentioned diameter.
 R93.7 means the closest 93.7 percent of the shot group will all be within a circle of the mentioned diameter.

The radius of a circle is half its diameter.

Civilian use
In Switzerland, the Karabiner Modell 31 is like other (ex) Swiss service rifles used for target shooting matches. Recreational practice with guns is a popular form of recreation, and is encouraged by the government, particularly for the members of the militia. For this the standard iron sights can be replaced by target shooting diopter and globe sight sighting lines. In other countries the K. 31/Kar. 31 can often be used in vintage military service rifle matches. Clamp-on sighting options for competition diopter style sights and telescopic sights make it easier to mount more precise aiming means than the standard factory tangent iron sights on the receiver. Many competition shooters are able to achieve 1 MOA shooting groups with unmodified K. 31/Kar. 31s with the factory tangent iron sight line.

To celebrate its introduction in the Swiss armed forces a small commemorative batch of Karabiner Modell 31s was produced 80 years later.

In rare instances, the locking lugs of some K. 31/Kar. 31 rifles can develop cracks that can be visually determined by the naked eye or with the help of a loupe. Rifles with substandard locking lugs should be immediately be withdrawn from shooting and professionally repaired to prevent dangerous situations.

Gallery

Media
A video of the K. 31/Kar. 31 straight pull bolt in action: 
In the film Shining Through, a Swiss border guard, with his K. 31/Kar. 31, shot a German sniper firing at Ed and Linda as they were crossing over the Swiss border.
The sniper variant of the K31, the K31/43 appears in the first-person shooter Battlefield V which is part of the Summer Update.
The K31 is featured in Call Of Duty: Black Ops Cold War as a DLC weapon called the Swiss K31 which is part of the Season 3 battle pass.

Users

See also
Antique gun
M1895 Lee Navy - An American straight-pull bolt-action rifle
Ross rifle - A Canadian straight-pull bolt-action rifle
Steyr-Mannlicher M1895 - An Austrian straight-pull bolt-action rifle

References

External links

 Swiss Rifles
The Swiss Rifles Message Board
Surplusrifle.com's articles on the K. 31/Kar. 31
Modern Firearms entry on the K. 31/Kar. 31
chuckhawks.com article on the K. 31/Kar. 31
Manufacture Dates of Swiss Schmidt–Rubin Rifles
Site and tool to determine manufacture year of Swiss Schmidt–Rubin Rifles
Webbased Tool to find the manufacture year based on the manufacturer serial number (German Website)
The K. 31/Kar. 31 Swiss Service Rifle
Swiss Karabiner 1931 

Straight-pull rifles
Rifles of Switzerland
7.5×55mm Swiss firearms
Articles containing video clips
Military equipment introduced in the 1930s